Hausa cuisines are traditional and modern food prepared by Hausa people. It is based on the availability of raw food materials they can farm or provide from other places. Most times Hausa people depend purely on the farm products they have cultivated for food preparations. Hausa people have a meal that is common to most Zongo communities called Tuo Zaafi.

Breakfast 
Hausa people take breakfast very seriously. They take light liquid foods for breakfast. These foods are usually prepared at home, but some Hausa people use to buy commercial food from either food houses or street food sellers. Most Hausa take the following foods as breakfast:
 
Koko and kosai: This food is majority taken by at least 70% of Hausa people as breakfast, kosai is a dish which is made from a peeled beans formed into a ball and then deep-fried in palm oil, while koko is a porridge and a traditional hausa food made from millet, maize, guinea corn and tiger nut with a small amount of additives that are added to make it nourish. Koko is of different varieties to Hausa food preparations, there are the following types of Koko:
 
 Koko: It is made from a liquefaction liquid obtain from a grinded millet.
 Kunun tsamiya: made from a powdered millet
 Kunun gyada: made from liquefaction of Groundnut with a boiled raize added inside
 Kunun dawa: made from guinea corn
 Kunun acha: made from ache
 Kunun masara: made from maize
 Kunun aya: a drink made from a tiger nut, similar to tiger milk. 
 Kunun kanwa: made from millet, but entirely different from kunun tsamiya
 
 Waina or Masa:
 Coffee and bread: In the modern days, hausa people take coffee and bread as breakfast. It was not part of their tradition but it was adopted as a result of the British colonisation

Lunch 
 
 Dambu
 Dan wake: these are Beans Dumplings prepared by boiling, eaten either with palm oil or groundnut oil with a fine grinded pepper
 Fate
 Taliya
 Shinkafa
 Alale in Hausa

Dinner 
 
 Tuwo: made from flour of maize, millet or guinea corn, a thick pudding usually eaten with different kinds of soup, usually, Miyan kuka is the common soup made from a powdered dried baobab leaves that has been ground into powder, it is dark in color. Followed by Okro soup (dried and fresh soups ), taushe, miyan kubewa and others.
Shinkafa:
 Funkaso:

Beverages and drinks 
Sobo: a natural drink made from a dry zobo flower (roselle plant)

Snacks 
Kuli Kuli

Chin chin

Alkaki: (doughnuts) made from wheat and sugar paste

Gallery

References 

Nigerian cuisine
Cuisine by ethnicity